is the 32nd single by the Japanese idol girl group AKB48. It was released in Japan on August 21, 2013. The single contains graduation songs for Mariko Shinoda and Tomomi Itano.

The song has been recorded by AKB48's international sister groups in their respective local languages, including the Indonesian version by JKT48, released on the same date as the original Japanese version; the Chinese Mandarin version by SNH48, released in 2013; the Thai version by BNK48, released in 2017; and the Filipino version by MNL48, released in 2018; and the Vietnamese version by SGO48, released in December 2019.

2013 general election
The lineup for the title track and supporting B-sides was determined by the results from the AKB48's 2013 general election. Rino Sashihara of HKT48 received the most votes and became the center, or headlining position, for the single. This is Sashihara's first time as a center for an AKB48 single.

The participants in the single included members who had graduated or announced graduation plans. AKB48 member Mariko Shinoda, who placed fifth overall in the election, announced on the election results day that she would be graduating; her ceremony was held on July 21. Tomomi Itano, who placed 11th overall, had announced her intent to graduate back in February 2013. Natsumi Hirajima, a candidate who had already graduated prior to the election voting period, placed 62nd overall.

Promotion and release
On June 23, AKB48 member Rino Sashihara announced on Fuji TV's late-night show, AKB Eizou Center, that the title of the 32nd single would be "Koi Suru Fortune Cookie" and a release date of August 21.

The single was released in four versions: Type A, Type K, Type B and Theater Edition. The non-theater versions have limited editions for their first pressings. While each regular edition has one of 50 different kinds of photos, each limited edition has one of two types of tickets for a handshake event.

The title song was first performed in the TBS show "Ongaku no hi" on June 29.

Music video

The "Koi Suru Fortune Cookie" music video was filmed on June 22, in Fukuoka, HKT48's home and where AKB48 member Mariko Shinoda is from. It involved 3,800 extras, the most for any AKB48 and sister group-related video since "Banzai Venus" which had about 1,000 people.

The choreography was done by Papaya Suzuki. Some of the AKB48 members commented on the music video. Mayu Watanabe said "It makes you feel like telling your fortunes". Tomomi Itano said "It's a song you can liven up with everyone, and is also an enjoyable song, as you can copy the choreography with others." Minami Takahashi said "It's somehow nostalgic. It's like a large-scale disco."

On July 19, AKB48 released the Staff Version of the music video, which shows 365 members of the AKB48 staff and its sister groups performing some of the dance moves. The video was shot in seven days. The staff video was listed as the most watched YouTube video in Japan for the 2013 year with over 8 million views.

On  the music video reached 100 million views on YouTube, the second AKB48 music video to achieve this milestone (along with "Heavy Rotation"). This made AKB48 the first Japanese artist to have two music videos with over 100 million views on YouTube.

Live performances and other use
In March 2014, "Koi Suru Fortune Cookie" was listed as one of the songs on the Japanese game Just Dance Wii U

"Koi Suru Fortune Cookie" has been used as the departure melody on the Tokyo Metro Hibiya Line platforms of Akihabara Station from spring 2016.

In Weathering With You, Hina, Hodaka and Nagisa sing this song via the karaoke machine in their hotel room.

 64th NHK Kōhaku Uta Gassen, performed as a song of Kōhaku 2013 special: AKB48 Festival.
 66th NHK Kōhaku Uta Gassen, performed as a song of AKB Kouhaku 2015 SP ~10th Anniversary~, with the Graduated members, include Atsuko Maeda and Yuko Oshima.
 69th NHK Kōhaku Uta Gassen, performed with Thai group BNK48.
 70th NHK Kōhaku Uta Gassen, performed as ~Kōhaku World Selection SP~ with AKB48 Group.

In 2017, "Koi Suru Fortune Cookie" was performed along with "Heavy Rotation (song)" at 2017 Mnet Asian Music Awards in Japan.

Track listing

Type A

Type K

Type B

Theater

Personnel

"Koisuru Fortune Cookie"
The lineup for the title track consists of the top 16 members from AKB48's 2013 general election.

The number in brackets indicates the member's ranking.
Center: Rino Sashihara (1)
 Team A: Mariko Shinoda (5), Minami Takahashi (8), Yui Yokoyama (13), Mayu Watanabe (3)
 Team K: Tomomi Itano (11), Yuko Oshima (2)
 Team B: Yuki Kashiwagi (4), Haruna Kojima (9), Haruka Shimazaki (12)
 Team S (SKE48) / Team K: Jurina Matsui (6)
 Team KII (SKE48): Akari Suda (16)
 Team E (SKE48): Rena Matsui (7)
 Team N (NMB48) / Team B: Miyuki Watanabe (15)
 Team N (NMB48): Sayaka Yamamoto (14)
 Team H (HKT48): Rino Sashihara (1)
 SNH48: Sae Miyazawa (10)

"Ai no Imi o Kangaete Mita"
Performed by Undergirls, which consist of members who ranked 17 to 32 in AKB48's 2013 general election.
The number in brackets indicates the member's ranking.
Center: Aya Shibata (17)
 Team A: Anna Iriyama (30), Rina Kawaei (25)
 Team K: Rie Kitahara (21)
 Team B: Ayaka Umeda (19), Reina Fujie (32)
 Kenkyuusei: Minami Minegishi (18)
 Team S (SKE48): Masana Oya (29), Yuria Kizaki (22)
 Team KII (SKE48): Aya Shibata (17), Akane Takayanagi (23), Airi Furukawa (27)
 Team E (SKE48): Kanon Kimoto (31)
 Kenkyuusei (SKE48): Kaori Matsumura (24)
 Team M (NMB48): Nana Yamada (28)
 Team H (HKT48): Sakura Miyawaki (26)
 Team J (JKT48) / Team B: Aki Takajo (20)

"Kondo Koso Ecstasy"
Performed by Next Girls, which consist of members who ranked 33 to 48 in AKB48's 2013 general election.
The number in brackets indicates the member's ranking.
Center: Amina Sato (33)
 Team A: Yuka Tano (38)
 Team K: Asuka Kuramochi (36), Amina Sato (33), Mariya Nagao (35), Tomu Muto (45)
 Team B: Haruka Ishida (46), Haruka Katayama (34)
 Team B / Team KII (SKE48): Mina Ōba (48)
 Team S (SKE48): Makiko Saito (42)
 Team KII (SKE48): Ami Kobayashi (47), Rina Matsumoto (41)
 Team E (SKE48): Madoka Umemoto (39)
 Team M (NMB48) / Team A: Fuuko Yagura (44)
 Team N (NMB48): Kei Jonishi (40)
 Team H (HKT48): Aika Oota (43), Haruka Kodama (37)

"Suitei Marmalade"
Performed by Future Girls, which consist of members who ranked 49 to 64 in AKB48's 2013 general election.
The number in brackets indicates the member's ranking.
Center: Shu Yabushita (49)
 Team A: Ayaka Kikuchi (singer) (51), Sumire Sato (52), Sakiko Matsui (60)
 Team K: Ami Maeda (53)
 Team B: Misaki Iwasa (56), Suzuran Yamauchi (61)
 Team B / Team N (NMB48): Miori Ichikawa (57)
 Team S (SKE48): Kyoka Isohara (58), Yuka Nakanishi (64)
 Team E (SKE48): Shiori Kaneko (63)
 Team N (NMB48): Mayu Ogasawara (54), Akari Yoshida (50)
 Team BII (NMB48): Shu Yabushita (49)
 Kenkyuusei (HKT48): Meru Tashima (55), Mio Tomonaga (59)
 Graduated member: Natsumi Hirajima (62)

"Namida no Sei Janai"
Graduation Song of Mariko Shinoda.
 Team A: Mariko Shinoda, Minami Takahashi, Yui Yokoyama, Mayu Watanabe
 Team K: Tomomi Itano, Yuko Oshima
 Team B: Yuki Kashiwagi, Haruna Kojima, Haruka Shimazaki
 Kenkyuusei: Minami Minegishi
 Team S (SKE48) / Team K: Jurina Matsui
 Team H (HKT48): Rino Sashihara
 SNH48: Sae Miyazawa

"Saigo no Door"

Graduation Song for Tomomi Itano.
 Team A: Mariko Shinoda, Minami Takahashi, Yui Yokoyama, Mayu Watanabe
 Team K: Tomomi Itano, Yuko Oshima
 Team B: Yuki Kashiwagi, Haruna Kojima, Haruka Shimazaki
 Kenkyuusei: Minami Minegishi
 Team S (SKE48) / Team K: Jurina Matsui
 Team H (HKT48): Rino Sashihara
 SNH48: Sae Miyazawa

Charts
"Koi Suru Fortune Cookie" sold 1,095,894 copies on its first day of release, and reached number one on the Oricon weekly charts with over 1.33 million copies. This makes the group's 13th consecutive single to sell over a million copies, which ties a record with B'z. It is the group's 19th consecutive number-one single.

Weekly charts

Monthly chart

Year-end charts

Certifications

Release history

Accolades
Japanese Version

Thai Version

Indonesian version

JKT48 version

"" is the third released single from the Indonesian idol girl group JKT48. On August 21, 2013, it was simultaneously released with AKB48's release of "Koi Suru Fortune Cookie", under the label Hits Records.

Promotion and release
The AKB48 sister group JKT48 announced the release of "Fortune Cookie Yang Mencinta" ("Fortune Cookie in Love"), an Indonesian version of "Koi Suru Fortune Cookie", as its third single for August 21, 2013, the same day as the AKB48 release. A teaser for the music video was released on August 3.

Track listing
The single has two editions: Regular Version (CD+DVD) and Theater Version (CD only)

Regular Version

Bonus
 Team J Special Photo
 Team J & Team KIII Photo Group [Member Random]

Theater Version

Bonus
 Trump Card
 Handshake Event Ticket

Personnel

"Fortune Cookie Yang Mencinta"
Both the title track and the English version were performed by the following members.

Center : Haruka Nakagawa
 Team J / AKB48 Team B : Aki Takajo
 Team J: Haruka Nakagawa, Melody Nurramdhani Laksani, Shania Junianatha, Nabilah Ratna Ayu Azalia, Jessica Veranda, Ayana Shahab, Rena Nozawa, Beby Chaesara Anadila, Devi Kinal Putri, Sonia Natalia
Team KIII: Shinta Naomi, Rona Anggreani, Cindy Yuvia, Della Delila, Riskha Fairunissa

"First Rabbit"
Center : Melody Nurramdhani
Team J / AKB48 Team B :Aki Takajo 
Team J: Melody Nurramdhani Laksani, Shania Junianatha, Nabilah Ratna Ayu Azalia, Haruka Nakagawa, Jessica Veranda, Ayana Shahab, Sonia Natalia, Rezky Wiranti Dhike, Cindy Gulla, Rica Leyona, Gabriela Margareth Warouw, Ghaida Farisya, Frieska Anastasia Laksani, Sendy Ariani, Delima Rizky

"Baby! Baby! Baby!
"Baby! Baby! Baby!" (Passionate Prayer Version) was performed by Team KIII: 
 
Team KIII: Alicia Chanzia, Cindy Yuvia, Della Delila, Intar Putri Kariina, Jennifer Hanna, Lidya Maulida Djuhandar, Nadila Cindi Wantari, Natalia, Noella Sisterina, Octi Sevpin, Ratu Vienny Fitrilya, Riskha Fairunissa, Rona Anggreani, Shinta Naomi, Thalia, Viviyona Apriani

SNH48 version

"Fortune Cookie of Love" was redone in Mandarin for AKB48's sister group in China, SNH48, as the group's third EP. It was available for ordering on November 25, 2013, in Beijing, and November 29, 2013, in Shanghai.

Original Japanese lyrics:

 Yasushi Akimoto

Chinese lyrics:

 Gu Rui
 Gou Qing

Composer:

 Shintaro Ito
 Yō Yamazaki
 Yoshimasa Inoue
 Yoko Kensuke

Track listing
 Bold indicates centres.

BNK48 version

The Thai idol group BNK48, a sister group of AKB48, covered the song, naming it "Cookie Siangthai" ("Fortune Cookie").

Promotion and release
The group performed the song for the first time at the concert 2017: 411 Fandom Party in Bangkok, held at Siam Paragon in Bangkok on the night of 30 August 2017. Sixteen of the thirty members of the group formed a provisional senbatsu to perform the song at the event, including Can, Cherprang, Izurina, Jan, Jennis, Kaew, Kaimook, Miori, Mobile, Music, Namneung, Noey, Orn, Pun, Pupe, and Tarwaan.

The group also performed the song with World Order to open the Japan Expo in Thailand 2017 at Siam Paragon on 1 September 2017.

At the concert marking the graduation of Kidcat on 23 September 2017 in Bangkok, it was announced that the song would be released as the second single of the group, containing the song as the title track and two other songs as the B-side tracks, that is, "BNK48 (Bangkok48)", the eponymous anthem of the group which is a cover of "AKB48 (Akihabara48)", and "Phlio", a cover of "Skirt, Hirari".

It was also announced at the same event that sixteen members of the group who are the regular senbatsu for the songs "Cookie Siangthai" and "BNK48 (Bangkok48)" consist of Cherprang, Izurina, Jan, Jennis, Kaew, Kaimook, Miori, Mobile, Music, Namneung, Noey, Orn, Pun, Pupe, Satchan, and Tarwaan, with Mobile as the centre for the former song and Cherprang as the centre for the latter song, whilst seven of the undergirls in charge of the song "Phlio" are Jaa, Jane, Jib, Kate, Mind, Namsai, and Nink, with Jaa and Mind as the centres.

Officially released on 20 December 2017, the single was available for purchase from 29 September 2017 to 6 November 2017 only. It sold a total of 30,000 copies.
and was streamed 1,000,000 times until 12 February 2018 

The music video for "Cookie Siangthai" was premiered at a mini concert held at J.J Mall in Bangkok on 18 November 2017 and was published on YouTube later that day. By April 2018, the YouTube video has surpassed 100 million views which is considered as a breakthrough point of the band's career.

Production
The single was produced by Pongchuk Pissathanporn and Tanupop Notayanont from La-Ong-Fong band. The Thai lyrics were written by Pongchuk, Tanupop, and Trai Bhumiratna.

The cover art of the single, produced by The Uni_form Design Studio, was revealed on 1 November 2017, depicting the sixteen senbatsu members with elements representing their favourite sweet foods, such as thong yip and biscuit, as well as Bangkok landmarks mentioned in the group's anthem, including the Giant Swing and the Temple of Dawn.

Directed by Chainarong Tampong, the music video for the title song was shot on 4 November 2017 at the Siam Park City in Bangkok, featuring a number of fans who passed a competition in which they covered the choreography of the song.

Criticism
The group's company, BNK48 Office, went under fire for neglecting the names of some senbatsu members on the single booklets.

Track listing
 Bold indicates centres.

MNL48 version

AKB48's Filipino sister group MNL48 released their rendition of the song as their second single titled "Pag-Ibig Fortune Cookie".

Release
The single was announced during the Aitakatta – Gustong Makita Handshake event at Movie Stars Cafe on November 25, 2018. Brei, Belle, Coleen, Rans, Lei, Mari, Jan and Kay were formally introduced as the new Senbatsu members for the single, together with Faith, Alyssa, Jem, Gabb, Sela, Abby and Sheki, who is still Center. An exclusive viewing of the music video was also held followed by a live performance of the song. The music video was subsequently uploaded to YouTube on the same date.

Track listing
 Bold indicates centres.

Sales and Certification

SGO48 version 

Similar to its other sister 48 groups, a Vietnamese-adapted version of the song was released as the second single of SGO48 by YAG Entertainment on December 29, 2019, titled "Koisuru Fortune Cookie - Thất tình tích cực." The release also contains Vietnamese version of three other AKB48 songs, namely "Namida Surprise!", "Shoujotachi yo" and "365 nichi no Kamihikouki", with the former having previously performed during the group's participation at the AKB48 Group Asia Festival 2019 in Shanghai. Similar to the group's previous single, all senbatsu performers for the song were pre-selected. It was the first single appearance of member Xuân Ca, and subsequently the last single appearance of Sachi, as well as three other Under Girls: Gia Nghi, Elena, and Celia, with the former having graduated shortly before the single announcement.

To promote the single, an accompanying music video was premiered on their YouTube channel on December 12, 2019, along with another documentary series focusing on the senbatsu announcement and practicing process for the song.

Background and release 
Following the group's announcement to host their first Christmas mini show in December 2019, titled Koisuru Xmas Party on November 22, 2019, YAG Entertainment confirmed that Under Girls member Gia Nghi would graduate to focus on studying a week later, with her final activities being on the mini show's date. On the same day, the label also revealed the teaser for SGO48's next single to be "Koisuru Fortune Cookie - Thất tình tích cực", with the song being performed live and its accompanying music video being premiered for the first time during the group's Koisuru Xmas Party on December 7, 2019.

Single type 
Similar to the group's first single release, the physical version comes in four different types with the same contents, including a collectible digital card, a random bonus photo, a lyric book, and a handshake ticket.

Track listing

Notes 

 "Namida Surprise!" was recorded with two other Under Girls members, namely Dona and Gia Nghi, with the latter being her last recording appearance.

Notes

References
 Releases

 Other references

External links
 
 Discography at JKT48.com 

2013 singles
AKB48 songs
JKT48 songs
BNK48 songs
MNL48 songs
Songs with lyrics by Yasushi Akimoto
King Records (Japan) singles
Oricon Weekly number-one singles
Internet memes introduced in 2013